Karl Gunnar Morén (born 21 September 1959 in Ludvika) is a Swedish musician. With his wife, he plays in Ludvika Spelmanstrio. He is concertmaster for Grängesbergs orkesterförening and plays violin in the band Östen med Resten.

Career
When he was 8 years old, he started play guitar and mandolin. At 11, he played violin.

References

External links

Living people
1959 births
Swedish violinists
Male violinists
21st-century violinists
21st-century Swedish male musicians
Melodifestivalen contestants of 2003
Melodifestivalen contestants of 2002